Eric Sock (born September 22, 1990) is an American tennis player.

Tennis career

Sock played college tennis at the University of Nebraska–Lincoln.

Personal life
In January 2015, Sock was placed on life support for eight days due to Lemierre's syndrome. After initially thinking it was just a sore throat, Sock was taken to the emergency room, where doctors told him that he would have likely died the following day.

References

External links
 
 

1990 births
Living people
American male tennis players
Nebraska Cornhuskers men's tennis players
Tennis people from Nebraska